Special People is an album by American jazz drummer Andrew Cyrille recorded in 1980 for the Italian Soul Note label.

Reception

The AllMusic review awarded the album 3 stars.  

The authors of the Penguin Guide to Jazz Recordings commented: "Pieces like 'High Priest'... represent a significant extension of 1960s radicalism into a more formal and tradition-aware context. In that regard, Daniel is an ideal collaborator."

Track listing
All compositions by Andrew Cyrille, except where noted
 "A Girl Named Rainbow" (Ornette Coleman) - 10:10 
 "High Priest" - 7:48 
 "Fortified Nucleolus" - 5:12 
 "Baby Man" (John Stubblefield) - 6:40 
 "Special People" - 7:05
Recorded at Barigozzi Studio in Milano, Italy in October 21 & 22, 1980

Personnel
Andrew Cyrille - drums, percussion
Ted Daniel - trumpet, flugelhorn
David S. Ware - tenor saxophone
Nick DiGeronimo - bass

References

Black Saint/Soul Note albums
Andrew Cyrille albums
1980 albums